Brian George Hodgson (29 January 1936 – 14 February 2018) was an English professional footballer who played as a forward.

References

1936 births
2018 deaths
People from Cleethorpes
English footballers
Association football forwards
Grimsby Town F.C. players
Workington A.F.C. players
Boston United F.C. players
English Football League players